John Manning Brinck (September 16, 1908 – May 19, 1934) was an American rower who competed in the 1928 Summer Olympics. In 1928, he was part of the American boat, which won the gold medal in the eights. Brinck was shot dead in a robbery in Texas in 1934.

References

1908 births
1934 deaths
Rowers at the 1928 Summer Olympics
Olympic gold medalists for the United States in rowing
American male rowers
Male murder victims
Medalists at the 1928 Summer Olympics
People murdered in Texas
Deaths by firearm in Texas